Books about the U.S. military or for members of the military.

General
Classified Secret-Controlling Air Strikes in the Clandestine War in Laos by Jan Churchill
Code Name Bright Light-US POW Rescue Efforts in the Vietnam War by George J. Veith
10,000 Days Of Thunder- A History of the Vietnam War by Philip Caputo
Fast Movers-Jet Pilots and the Vietnam Experience by John Darrell Sherwood
In Retrospect: The Tragedy and Lessons of Vietnam by (Former Secretary of Defense) Robert S. McNamara
Inside the Danger Zone: The U.S. Military in the Persian Gulf 1987-88 by Harold Wise
One Shot, One Kill- American Combat Snipers: WWII, Korea, Vietnam, Beirut by Charles W. Sasser/Craig Roberts
Oxford Essential Dictionary of the U.S. Military by Oxford University Press
Pathfinder: First In, Last Out by Richard R. Burns
REQUIEM: By The Photographers Who Died In Vietnam and Indochina by Random House
The Secret War Against Hanoi-Kennedy's and Johnson's use of spies, Saboteurs, and covert warriors in North Vietnam by Richard H. Shultz Jr.
Stolen Valor: How The Vietnam Generation Was Robbed Of Its Heroes And Its History by B. G. Burkett and Glenna Whitley
Vietnam Firebases, 1965-1973 by Randy E. M. Foster
Vietnam Order of Battle by Shelby L. Stanton
Where We Were In Vietnam: A Comprehensive Guide To The Firebases, Military Installations, and Naval Vessels Of The Vietnam War, 1945-1975 by Michael P. Kelley

Army
A Bright Shining Lie by Neil Sheehan
Acceptable Loss-Fighting in Vietnam by Kregg P. Jorgenson
American Warrior: A Combat Memoir Of Vietnam by John "Doc" Bahansen Jr.
A Soldier Reports by GEN William C. Westmoreland
A Hundred Miles of Bad Road by D. W. Birdwell & K. W. Nolan
The Army and Vietnam by Andrew F. Krepinevich Jr.
Battle For Hue, Tet 1968 by Keith Nolan
Bell UH-1 Huey "Slicks" 1962-75 by Chris Bishop
Black Hawk Down by Mark Bowden
Chickenhawk by Robert Mason
Death In The A-Shau Valley, L Company LRRP's Vietnam, 1969-1970 by Larry Chambers
Death Valley, Summer Offensive, August 1968 by K. W. Nolan
Dispatches by Michael Herr
Doc: Platoon Medic by Daniel E. Evans Jr.
Dustoff-The Memoir of an Army Aviator by Michael J. Novosel
Eyes Behind The Lines-L Company Rangers in Vietnam 1968 by Gary A. Linderer
Gunslingers In Action, Cobra-Vietnam by Lou Drendel
Hamburger Hill, The Brutal Battle For Dong Ap Bia, May 11–20, 1969 by Samuel Zaffiri
House To House-Playing The Enemy's Game, Saigon, May 1968 by Keith W. Nolan
If I Die in a Combat Zone, Box Me Up and Ship Me Home by Tim O'Brien
In Pharaoh's Army: Memoirs of the Lost War by Tobias Wolff
Into Laos, The Story of Lam Son 719/Dewey Canyon II, 1971 by Keith W. Nolan
The Killing Zone- My Life In The Vietnam War by Frederick Downs
Low Level Hell by Hugh Mills
Mounted Combat In Vietnam by GEN Donn A. Starry
Recondo: LRRP's In Vietnam by Larry Chambers
Ringed in Steel: Armored Cavalry, Vietnam 1967-1968 by Michael D. Mahler
RIPCORD(Firebase), Screaming Eagles Under Siege, Vietnam 1970 by K. W. Nolan
Rolling Thunder, In A Gentle Land by Andrew Wiest
Sappers in the Wire - The Life and Death of FIREBASE MARY ANN by Keith W. Nolan
Snake Pilot: Flying The Cobra Attack Helicopter In Vietnam by Randy R. Zahn
Six Silent Men- LRRP's In Vietnam by Kenn Miller
SOG: The Secret Wars of America's Commandos by John Plaster
Tanks in the Wire! - The First Use Of Enemy Armor In Vietnam by David B. Stockwell
The 13th Valley, by John M. DelVecchio
Tank Sergeant-1/69th Armor, Vietnam by Ralph Zumbro
They Marched Into Sunlight: War and Peace, Vietnam and America, October 1967 by David Maraniss
Thunderbolt: General Creighton Abrams and the Army of His Time by Lewis Sorley
To The Limit- An Air Cavalry Pilot In The Vietnam War by Tom A. Johnson
The Tunnels Of Cu Chi by Tom Mangold
Through The Valley, Vietnam, 1967-1968 by James F. Humphries
US Army AH-1 Cobra Units in Vietnam by Johnathon Bernstein
US Infantry, Vietnam by Jim Mesko
Vietnam Choppers, Helicopters In Battle 1950-1975 by Simon Dunstan
Vietnam Airmobile Warfare Tactics by Bruce B. G. Clarke
Westmoreland: A Biography of General William Westmoreland by Samuel Zaffiri
We Served In Silence by author Glenn K. Fannin Jr. A Vietnam war novel relating the activities of the Army Security Agency. Recently categorized as Unclassified by the NSA.
We Were Soldiers Once… And Young: Ia Drang—The Battle That Changed The War In Vietnam by LTG Harold G. Moore

Navy
A-6 Intruders In Vietnam by Jesse Randall
AD Skyraider-In Detail & Scale by Bert Kinzey
The Bluejacket's Manual by Thomas J. Cutler
Brown Water, Black Berets-Coastal and Riverine Warfare In Vietnam by Thomas J. Cutler LCDR USN
Confession To A Deaf God- Memoir Of A Mekong River Rat by Gary R. Blinn
Crusader! Last of the Gunfighters by Rear Admiral Paul T. Gillcrist
Douglas A-1 Skyraider-Warbird Tech V13-Revised by Larry Davis
Douglas A-1 Skyraider by Robert F. Dorr
Douglas A-4 Skyhawk by Peter Kilduff
F-8 Crusader In Detail & Scale by Bert Kinzey
F-8 Crusader Units of the Vietnam War by Peter Mersky
F-8 Crusader In Action by Jim Sullivan
First SEAL, by Lieutenant Commander Roy Boehm & Charles Sasser
Fox Two- The Story Of America's First Ace In Vietnam by R. Cunningham/Jeffrey Ethell
Gray Ghosts-US Navy and Marine Corps Phantoms by Peter E. Davies
In the Shadow of Greatness by USNA Class of 2002
Inside the Danger Zone: The U.S. Military in the Persian Gulf 1987-88 by Harold Wise
Launch The Intruders: A Naval Attack Squadron In The Vietnam War 1972 by Carol Reardon
McDonnell Douglas A-4 Skyhawk By Brad Elward
One Perfect Op: An Insider's Account of the Navy SEAL Special Warfare Teams, by Master Chief Dennis "Snake" Chalker & Kevin Dockery
On Yankee Station- The Naval Air War Over Vietnam by CDR John B. Nichols
Point Man, by Chief James "Patches" Watson & Kevin Dockery
The Real Team, By Commander Richard Marcinko & ten SEAL Team 6 veterans
Riverine- A Pictorial History of the Brown Water War In Vietnam by Jim Mesko
River Rats by Ralph Christopher
Rogue Warrior, by Commander Richard Marcinko & John Weisman
Stop and Search - A novel of small boat warfare off Vietnam (1969) by W. E. Butterworth
Swift Boat Down-The Real Story Of The Sinking Of PCF-19 by James Steffes, ENC Retired
The Vietnam Brown Water Navy 1965-1969 by Gordon L. Rottman
Topgun Days by Dave "Bio" Baranek
Tour of Duty- (Senator) John Kerry and the Vietnam War by Douglas Brinkley
Vietnam-The Naval Story by Frank Uhlig Jr.
US Navy F-4 Phantom II MIG KILLERS 1972-1973 by Brad Elward/Peter E. Davies
US Small Combatants-From PT Boats to the Brown Water Navy by Norman Friedman
War On The Rivers-A Swift Boat Sailor's Chronicle Of The Battle For The Mekong Delta by Weymouth D. Symmes

Marine Corps

A Sniper In The Arizona, 2/5th Marines in the Arizona Territory 1967 by John J. Culbertson
Ambush Valley: I Corps Vietnam 1967-A Marine Battalion's Battle For Survival by Eric Hammel
13 Cent Killers: The 5th Marine Snipers in Vietnam by John Culbertson
Basrah, Baghdad, and Beyond: U.S. Marine Corps in the Second Iraq War by N.E. Reynolds
Battle Cry, by Leon Uris
Bloody Tarawa by Eric Hammel and John E. Lane
Boot by Daniel Da Cruz
Born on the Fourth of July by Ron Kovic
Breakout by Martin Russ
The Bridge at Dong Ha by John Grider Miller
Chesty: The Story of Lieutenant General Lewis B. Puller, USMC by Jon T. Hoffman
Corps Business: The 30 Management Principles of the U.S. Marines by David H. Freedman
Dauntless Marine - Joseph Sailer Jr., Dive Bombing Ace of Guadalcanal by Alexander S. White
Dear Mom: A Sniper's Vietnam - Joseph T. WardDevilbirds by John A. De ChantDog Company Six by Edwin Howard SimmonsExpendable Warriors: The Battle For Khe Sanh by Bruce B. G. ClarkeFields of Fire by James WebbFirst to Fight: An Inside View of the U.S. Marine Corps by Victor H.KrulakFlags of Our Fathers by James BradleyFlying Leathernecks by Richard G. Hubler & John A. De ChantFortunate Son: The Autobiography of Lewis B. Puller, Jr. by Lewis Puller Jr.Generation Kill by Evan Wright
Gray Ghosts - US Navy and Marine Corps Phantoms by Peter E. Davies
Guadalcanal - The Definitive Account of the Landmark battle by Richard B. Frank
Guidebook for Marines, by the staff of the Marine Corps Association
HOGs in the Shadows - Combat Stories from Marine Snipers in Iraq by Milo S. Afong
History of Marine Corps Aviation in World War II by Robert Sherrod
Hill 488 by Ray Hildreth/Charles W. Sassar
Hold High the Torch - A History of the 4th Marines by Kenneth W. Conduit & Edwin T. Turnbladh
"I'm Staying with My Boys..." The Heroic Life of Sgt. John Basilone, USMC by Jim Proser
In the Shadow of Greatness by USNA Class of 2002
Images of America - Camp Pendleton by Thomas O'Hara
Iwo Jima - Portraits of a Battle by Eric Hammel
Jarhead: A Marine's Chronicle of the Gulf War and Other Battles by Anthony Swofford
The Journal of Patrick Seamus Flaherty: United States Marine Corps, Khe Sanh 1968 by Ellen Emerson White
Making the Corps, by Thomas E. Ricks
Marine: A Guided Tour of a Marine Expeditionary Unit by Tom Clancy
Marine Fighting Squadron Nine (VF-9M) by Jess C. Barrow
Marine Rifleman: Forty-Three Years in the Corps by Wesley Fox
The Marine Officer's Guide by Kenneth W. Estes
Marine Sniper - 93 Confirmed Kills-Carlos Hathcock, Vietnam by Charles W. Henderson
Mongoose in the Sand by Ron Godby
No Bended Knee : The Battle for Guadalcanal by Merrill B. Twining, Neil G. Carey (Editor)
No True Glory: a Frontline Account of the Battle of Fallujah, by Bing West
One Bullet Away: The Making of a Marine Officer by Nathaniel C. Fick
Operation Buffalo: USMC Fight for the DMZ by Keith William Nolan
Operation Tuscaloosa-2/5th Marines at An Hon, 1967 by John J. Culbertson
Phase Line GREEN, The Battle For Hue, 1968 by Nicholas Warr
A Rumor Of War-Marines In Vietnam by Philip Caputo
Semper Fi in the Sky - The Marine Air Battles of World War II by Gerald Astor
Semper Fidelis - The History of the United States Marine Corps by Allan Millett
Semper Fi: Vietnam by Edward F. Murphy
Stay off the Skyline - The Sixth Marine Division on Okinawa by Laura Homan Lacey
The Highway War - A Marine Company Commander in Iraq by Seth Folsom
The March Up: Taking Baghdad with the 1st Marine Division by Ray L. Smith & Bing West
The U.S. Marine Corps Story by J. Robert Moskin
The U.S. Marine Corps: An Illustrated History by Merrill L. Bartlett
The Village by Bing West
Uncommon Men: The Sergeants Major of the Marine Corps by Alfred M. Gray
United States Marine Corps Air Stations of World War II by M.L. Shettle
United States Marine Corps Aviation Squadron Lineage, Insignia and History Volume 1 by Michael J. Crowler
U.S. Marine Corps Aviation - 1912 to Present by Peter Mersky
U.S. Marine Corps Aviation Unit Insignia 1941 - 1946 by Jeff Millstein
USMC: A Complete History by Jon T. Hoffman
US Marines In Vietnam 1965-1973 by Charles D. Melson
US Marine Corps Tank Crewman 1965-1970 Vietnam by Oscar Gilbert
The Walking Dead: A Marine's Story of Vietnam by Charles W. Sasser/Craig Roberts
The War That Would Not End-US Marines In Vietnam by Charles D. Melson
Warlord - No Better Friend, No Worse Enemy - Ilario Pantano
Warrior Culture of the U.S. Marines by Marion F. Sturkey
Shoulder to Shoulder with the Marines Who Took Fallujah by Patrick K. O'Donnell
With the Old Breed by E.B. Sledge

Air Force

Aces and Aerial Victories-USAF In Southeast Asia 1965-1973 by R. Frank Futrell
Air War Hanoi by Robert F. Dorr
A Code To Keep by Ernie Brace
And Kill Migs by Lou Drendel
Bury Us Upside Down- The Misty Pilots And The Secret Battle For The Ho Chi Minh Trail by Rick Newman
Clashes-Air Combat Over North Vietnam 1965-1972 by Marshall L. Michel
Code Of Honor by Lt Col John A. Dramesi
Check Six- A Fighter Pilot Looks Back by Maj Gen F. C. Blesse
Convair F-102 Delta Dagger-A Photo Chronicle by Wayne Mutza
Development and Employment of Fixed-wing Gunships 1962-1972 by Frederick Shaw/Timothy Warnock
The Eleven Days of Christmas: America's Last Vietnam Battle (B-52's Maximum Effort) by Marshall L. Michael
First In, Last Out: Stories By The Wild Weasels In Vietnam by Edward T. Rock
F-4C, F-4D, & RF-4C Phantom II In Detail & Scale by Bert Kinzey
F-100 Super Sabre: In Action by Larry Davis
F-105 Thunderchief: Walk Around by Ken Neubeck
F-105 Thunderchief: In Action by Ken Neubeck
Hit My Smoke! Forward Air Controllers in Southeast Asia by Jan Churchill
Journey Into Darkness-The Story of a (F-104) Starfighter Pilot in Vietnam by Col Philip E. Smith/Peggy Herz
The Linebacker Raids-The Bombing of North Vietnam, 1972 by John T. Smith
Linebacker II - A Strategic and Tactical Case Study by Lt Col Leonard D. G. Teixeira
Lockheed F-104 Starfighter by Jim Upton
Lockheed F-104 Starfighter by Martin Bowman
Lockheed SR-71-The Secret Missions Exposed by Paul F. Crickmore
Lockheed's SR-71 "BlackBird" Family, A-12, F-12, D-21, SR-71 by James C. Goodall
Lockheed SR-71 Blackbird by Steve Pace
Lockheed U-2 Dragon Lady by Dennis Jenkins
The Lovable One-Niner- A Complete History of the Cessna L-19 Bird Dog by Minard D. Thompson
McDonnell Douglas F-4 Gun Nosed Phantoms by Kris Hughes, Walter Dranem
Magic 100- An F-105 Fighter Pilot's 100 Combat Missions In Vietnam by Brig Gen Al Lenski
Martin B-57 Canberra- The Complete Record by Robert C. Mikesh
McDonnell F-101 Voodoo by Robert F. Dorr
100 Missions North by Kenneth H. Bell
North American F-100 Super Sabre by Peter E. Davies
North American F-100 Supersabre by David A. Anderton
Once a Fighter Pilot by Brig Gen Jerry W. Cook
One Day Too Long-Top Secret Site 85 and the Bombing of North Vietnam by Timothy N. Castle
One Day in a Long War. May 10, 1972, Air War, North Vietnam by Jeffrey Ethell
Over The Beach-The Air War In Vietnam by Zalin Grant
Palace Cobra-A Fighter Pilot In The Vietnam Air War by Ed Rasimus
Pak Six-A Story of the War in the Skies of North Vietnam by Gene I. Basel
The Phantom Story by Anthony M. Thornborough and Peter E. Davies
The Rescue of BAT-21 by Darrel D. Whitcomb
Republic F-105 Thunderchief by David Anderton
Republic F-105 Thunderchief by Larry Davis/David Menard
Rolling Thunder by John T. Smith
Roll Call: Thud-A photographic Record of the F-105 Thunderchief by J. M. Campbell/M. Hill
SAC Tanker Operations in the Southeast Asia War by Charles K. Hopkins
SR-71 Blackbird: Stories, Tales, and Legends by Rich Graham
SR-71 Revealed: The Inside Story by Rich Graham
Thunderchief: The Right Stuff and How Fighter Pilots Get It by Don Henry
Thud Ridge- F-105 Thunderchief Missions Over Vietnam by Jack Broughton
USAF F-4 Phantom II MIG KILLERS 1965-1968 by Peter E. Davies
Walk Around: SR-71 Blackbird by James C. Goodall
When Thunder Rolled-An F-105 Pilot Over North Vietnam by Ed Rasimus
Wild Weasel- The SAM Suppression Story by Larry Davis
Wolfpack-Hunting MiG's Over North Vietnam by Jerry Scutts
War For The Hell Of It: A Fighter Pilot's View Of Vietnam by Ed Cobleigh
Yeager: An Autobiography by Brig Gen Chuck Yeager

United States military
Books